In computational complexity theory, Håstad's switching lemma is a key tool for proving lower bounds on the size of constant-depth Boolean circuits.
Using the switching lemma,  showed that Boolean circuits of depth k in which only AND, OR, and NOT logic gates are allowed require size

 

for computing the parity function.

The switching lemma says that depth-2 circuits in which some fraction of the variables have been set randomly depend with high probability only on very few variables after the restriction. The name of the switching lemma stems from the following observation: Take an arbitrary formula in conjunctive normal form, which is in particular a depth-2 circuit. Now the switching lemma guarantees that after setting some variables randomly, we end up with a Boolean function that depends only on few variables, i.e., it can be computed by a decision tree of some small depth . This allows us to write the restricted function as a small formula in disjunctive normal form. A formula in conjunctive normal form hit by a random restriction of the variables can therefore be "switched" to a small formula in disjunctive normal form.

The original proof of the switching lemma  involves an argument with conditional probabilities.

See also 

 Boolean circuit
 Circuit satisfiability
 Circuit value problem
 Parity function

References 

 
 
 
 

Computational complexity theory
Circuit complexity